Alvados e Alcaria (officially União das Freguesias de Alvados e Alcaria) is a civil parish in the municipality of Porto de Mós, Portugal. The population in 2021 was 731, in an area of 24.45 km2. It was the result of two freguesias joining on 28 January 2013; Alvados and Alcaria.

References 

Parishes of Porto de Mós